Cavaellon or Cavaillon, is a commune and a rural town located in the Aquin Arrondissement of the Sud department of Haiti.

Geography
Its nearest neighboring towns/cities are Nan Cotie (12 km north), Saint-Louis-du-Sud (20 km southeast), and Les Cayes (16 km west).

Villages
Balou, Bedo, Bonne Fin, Digo Salo, Fevre, Garnd Dieu, Grand Place, Grand-Blois, Gross Mary, L'ellet, La Marche, Nan Cotie, Rosseau and Volbrune.

Personalities
The town is most famous for being the birthplace of both Benito Martínez Abrogán, Cuba's oldest-ever person, and George Valris, a famous Caribbean artist.

References

External links
 Map of Cavaillon, Sud, Haiti Haiti
 Latin and Caribbean Art

Populated places in Sud (department)
Communes of Haiti